Franklin Township is one of the twenty-two townships of Coshocton County, Ohio, United States. The 2010 census reported 1,229 people living in the township, 882 of whom were in the unincorporated portions of the township.

Geography
Located in the southern part of the county, it borders the following townships:
Tuscarawas Township - north
Lafayette Township - northeast
Linton Township - east
Monroe Township, Muskingum County - southeast corner
Adams Township, Muskingum County - south
Cass Township, Muskingum County - southwest
Virginia Township - west
Jackson Township - northwest

The village of Conesville is located in western Franklin Township.

Name and history
Franklin Township was organized in 1814.

It is one of twenty-one Franklin Townships statewide.

Government
The township is governed by a three-member board of trustees, who are elected in November of odd-numbered years to a four-year term beginning on the following January 1. Two are elected in the year after the presidential election and one is elected in the year before it. There is also an elected township fiscal officer, who serves a four-year term beginning on April 1 of the year after the election, which is held in November of the year before the presidential election. Vacancies in the fiscal officership or on the board of trustees are filled by the remaining trustees.

References

External links
County website

Townships in Coshocton County, Ohio
Townships in Ohio